David D. Bogart (March 31, 1860 – December 1912) was County Clerk and Recorder and the 6th Mayor of Missoula, Montana. He was born in Dawn Mills, Ontario, Canada and moved west with the construction of the Northern Pacific Railway until it reached Missoula in 1883. On May 7, 1888, he was elected as Missoula's 6th mayor and five years later would serve as the County Clerk and Recorder. On March 21, 1895 he was appointed Montana's first State Examiner and would act in the position for two years. Finally, he was elected as a state legislator to the 11 Legislative Assembly in 1909 and served a single term in the Montana House of Representatives. In December 1912, Bogart was killed in an avalanche in Saltese, Montana while prospecting for gold.

References

History of Missoula, Montana
Mayors of Missoula, Montana
People from Chatham-Kent
Pre-Confederation Ontario people
Canadian emigrants to the United States
Members of the Montana Territorial Legislature
Members of the Montana House of Representatives
Natural disaster deaths in Montana
Deaths in avalanches
American gold prospectors
1860 births
1912 deaths
19th-century American politicians